APW may refer to:

 Air pressurized water, a type of fire extinguisher
 All Points West Music & Arts Festival, held in Jersey City, New Jersey
 All Pro Wrestling, a professional wrestling promotion
 Angiosperm Phylogeny Website, dedicated to research on flowering plants
 AP World History, a college-level course offered to high school students
 Arrow Air, a former American cargo airline (ICAO code APW)
 Faleolo International Airport, Apia, Samoa (IATA code APW)
 People's Provincial Assembly, the political body governing the provinces of Algeria